Lakeland Elementary School may refer to several schools in the United States:

 Lakeland Elementary School of Lakeland, Tennessee
 Lakeland Elementary School of Humble, Texas
 Lakeland Elementary School of Lewisville, Texas
 Lakeland Elementary School of Auburn, Washington